The Franchise Affair is a British television series which originally aired on BBC One in 1962. It is based on the 1948 novel The Franchise Affair by Josephine Tey.

All six episodes are believed to be lost.

Main cast
 Rosalie Crutchley as Marion Sharpe
 Michael Aldridge as Robert Blair
 Veronica Turleigh as Mrs. Sharpe
 Gladys Boot as Aunt Lin
 Barry Wilsher as Leslie Wynn
 Derek Aylward as Tony Bredon
 Peggy Thorpe-Bates as  Mrs. Wynn
 Leslie French as Mr. Heseltine
 Jack May as Kevin Macdermott
 Edward Harvey as Chief Insp. Hallam
 Meg Wynn Owen as Betty Kane
 Clifford Earl as  Det. Insp. Grant
 Jennifer Hill as Miss Harker
 William Marlowe as Stan Peters

References

Bibliography
Baskin, Ellen . Serials on British Television, 1950-1994. Scolar Press, 1996.

External links
 

BBC television dramas
1962 British television series debuts
1962 British television series endings
English-language television shows
Television shows based on British novels